Debauve & Gallais is a French chocolate manufacturer founded by Sulpice Debauve in 1800. After his nephew Antoine Gallais joined the company in 1823, the company adopted their current name. In 1819 the company received the royal warrant as purveyors to the French court, and was the official chocolate supplier for Emperor Napoleon and of kings Louis XVIII, Charles X and Louis Philippe.

History
Sulpice Debauve (1757–1836), former chemist to French king Louis XVI, devised "the novel combination of cocoa, cane sugar, and medicine after Marie Antoinette complained to him about the unpleasant taste of the medicines she had to take." The queen was so pleased that she named those exquisite coin-shaped chocolates Pistoles. Debauve continued to create a variety of flavored Pistoles for the queen. Finally in 1800, Debauve opened his first chocolate shop on the Rive Gauche of Paris, at Faubourg Saint-Germain.

In 1816, Debauve was appointed as the sole chocolate supplier to the French royal families. In 1819, Napoleon's official architects Percier and Fontaine designed the new shop, which is now classified as a historical monument, located at 30 Rue des Saints-Pères. In 1823, Debauve took in his nephew Jean-Baptiste Auguste Gallais (1787–1838), also a chemist, as an associate in order to create and distribute his dietary chocolates; known then as "healthy chocolates" they were made with almond milk, vanilla and orange blossom water. Gallais published four years later in 1827 his Monographie du cacao ou manuel de l'amateur de chocolat which offered a scientific approach to chocolate.

Sulpice Debauve died in 1836, followed by his nephew Jean-Baptiste Galais in 1838. Their trade was then acquired by Mr. Théry who handed it over, in 1857, to Nicolas-Eugène Hugon. The later built in 1857 a factory powered by a steam engine, located in the 7th arrondissement of Paris. He was awarded a bronze medal at the Universal Exposition of Art and Industry of Paris in 1867.

His son Gustave took the head of the company in 1873 and contributed to raise Debauve & Gallais to the finest french chocolate brands. Striving to sell an affordable (3,80 francs per kilogram) premium chocolate (made of cocoa and sugar only), he was awarded a silver medal at the Universal Exposition of Paris in 1878 and a gold medal at the Universal Exposition of Antwerp the same year, for the chocolat éclair ("flash chocolate"), a product based on chocolate granules for making instant hot drinks. Other gold medals were obtained at the Universal Expositions of Paris in 1889  and 1900. Later, the shop and the factory became managed by the two sons of Gustave Hugon: Maurice and Georges. In the 1930s their respective sons, Jacques and Robert, took over the business. For more than a century, until the Hugon's factory shut down in 1966, the style of the shop and of the packaging of the Debauve & Gallais chocolates had been carefully conserved.

In contemporary times
Debauve & Gallais claims to be one of the few former royal suppliers in France who retain their independence, and are family owned and operated till today. In 1989, Madame Paule Cuvelier took over the Debauve & Gallais establishment. With the help of her son, Bernard Poussin, Debauve & Gallais have now expanded their business worldwide and have offices in New York, Seoul, Busan, Dubai, Tokyo, Nagoya, Osaka, Bucharest, Taipei, Hong Kong, Beijing, Nanjing, Shanghai, and Chengdu. The New York branch was run by Yoo Byung-eun's son Keith H. Yoo.

Appreciation
Debauve & Gallais offer a wide range of dark chocolates whose cocoa percentage comes as high as 99%. Over time they have built a cult following among gourmands, aristocrats, artists, writers and celebrities. Anatole France, author of Le Petit Pierre, described the shop as "lovely".

Bibliography

References

Further reading

External links
 

French chocolate companies
French brands
Manufacturing companies based in Paris
French Royal Warrant holders
Food and drink companies established in 1800
French companies established in 1800